Voluntarism is "any metaphysical or psychological system that assigns to the will (Latin: voluntas) a more predominant role than that attributed to the intellect", or equivalently "the doctrine that will is the basic factor, both in the universe and in human conduct". Voluntarism has appeared at various points throughout the history of philosophy, seeing application in the areas of metaphysics, psychology, political philosophy and theology.

The term voluntarism was introduced by Ferdinand Tönnies into the philosophical literature and particularly used by Wilhelm Wundt and Friedrich Paulsen.

Theological voluntarism

Medieval theological voluntarism 
Associated with Duns Scotus and William of Ockham (two of the foremost medieval scholastic philosophers), medieval theological voluntarism (not to be confused with meta-ethical theological voluntarism) is generally taken to be the philosophical emphasis on the divine will and human freedom over and above the intellect (voluntas superior intellectu). For example, Scotus held that morality comes from God's will and choice rather than his intellect or knowledge. Accordingly, God should be defined as an omnipotent being whose actions should not and cannot be ultimately rationalized and explained through reason. As such, voluntarism is usually contrasted with intellectualism, championed by the scholastic Thomas Aquinas.

Theological voluntarism as an approach to natural philosophy 
Theological voluntarism also refers to theological commitments—that is, specific interpretations of doctrines of Christianity—arguably held by certain early modern natural philosophers such as Pierre Gassendi, Walter Charleton, Robert Boyle, Isaac Barrow and Isaac Newton. It resulted in an empirical approach associated with early modern science.  Voluntarism therefore allows that faith or belief in God can be achieved by will as opposed to requiring a prior divine gift of faith to the individual. This notion holds at least in so far as it has found favor among some historians and philosophers (e.g. the historian Francis Oakley and the philosopher Michael B. Foster). A 20th-century theologian of voluntarism was James Luther Adams.

Metaphysical voluntarism 
A proponent of metaphysical voluntarism is 19th-century German philosopher Arthur Schopenhauer. In his view, the will is not reasoning, but an irrational, unconscious urge in relation to which the intellect represents a secondary phenomenon. The will is actually the force at the core of all reality. This putting out of the drive–intention–vital dynamics later influenced Friedrich Nietzsche (will to power), Philipp Mainländer (will to die), Eduard von Hartmann, Julius Bahnsen and Sigmund Freud (will to pleasure).

Epistemological voluntarism 
In epistemology, epistemological voluntarism is the view that belief is a matter of the will rather than one of simply registering one's cognitive attitude or degree of psychological certainty with respect to a stated proposition. If one is a voluntarist with respect to beliefs, it is coherent to simultaneously feel very certain about a particular proposition P and assign P a very low subjective probability. This is the basis of Bas van Fraassen's reflection principle.

Political voluntarism
Political voluntarism, or voluntaryism, is the view that understands political authority to be will-based. This view which was propounded by theorists like Thomas Hobbes, Jean-Jacques Rousseau and many members of the German idealist tradition understands political authority as emanating from a will.

In Marxist discourse, voluntarism was used to designate a connection between a philosophical commitment to metaphysical voluntarism (especially Machism) and a political commitment to extreme revolutionary tactics, particularly associated with Alexander Bogdanov. Today, most self-identified voluntaryists are libertarians.

Critical voluntarism 
Hugo Dingler's critical voluntarism in the philosophy of science is a form of conventionalism which posits that theorizing in the sciences starts with an unavoidable free decision of the will. The successor school of Dingler's critical voluntarism is the  methodical constructivism of the Erlangen School (cf. also the methodical culturalism of the Marburg School).

See also 
 Conatus
 Free will
 Voluntarism (action)
 Voluntarism (psychology)

Notes and references

External links 
 Voluntarism entry in the Internet Encyclopedia of Philosophy
 

Epistemological theories
Metaphysical theories
Theology
Scotism
Occamism
Criticism of rationalism